Tereza Kočiš (born April 27, 1934 in Sombor) is a former Serbian gymnast who competed for Yugoslavia. 

She represented Yugoslavia at the 1952 and 1960 Summer Olympics.

References
Tereza Kočiš biography and Olympic results at Sports-reference.com
 

1934 births
Living people
Serbian female artistic gymnasts
Yugoslav female artistic gymnasts
Olympic gymnasts of Yugoslavia
Gymnasts at the 1952 Summer Olympics
Gymnasts at the 1960 Summer Olympics
Sportspeople from Sombor
Medalists at the World Artistic Gymnastics Championships